John Dillinger (1903–1934) was an American gangster.

Dillinger may also refer to:

Films
Dillinger (1945 film), a film by Max Nosseck starring Lawrence Tierney
Dillinger (1960 film), a TV film by Mel Ferber starring Ralph Meeker
Dillinger (1973 film), a film by John Milius starring Warren Oates
Dillinger (1991 film), a TV film by Rupert Wainwright starring  Mark Harmon

Other
Dillinger (musician) (born 1953), reggae artist
Dillinger (surname)
Dillinger (bull), #81, a Professional Bull Riders World Champion bucking bull
Dillinger Hütte, a German steel fabricator
Dillinger, a thriller by Jack Higgins

See also
 Dellinger (disambiguation)
 Derringer, a small firearm sometimes mistakenly identified as a 'dillinger'
 Dillinja (born 1974), reggae/drum and bass music producer